The franc was the currency of Réunion until 1999. Before 1975, Réunion had its own franc, distinct from that of France. After 1975, the French franc circulated. Réunion now uses the euro. The Réunion franc was subdivided into 100 centimes.

History
The French franc circulated on Réunion alone (except for a single coin issue) until 1874, when distinct issues of currency commenced. Initially, notes of the Banque de la Réunion and the Colonial Treasury circulated alongside French currency. In 1896, coins were issued, followed by bank tokens in 1920. In 1945, the CFA franc was created and was adopted in Réunion, with distinct coins introduced in 1948. Although Réunion's paper money was stamped with the equivalent value in new francs from 1960, the new franc did not replace the Réunion franc until 1975, when French currency replaced Réunion's at a rate of 1 French (new) franc = 50 Réunion (CFA) francs.

Coins

 1779/80 - 3 sols "Isles de France et de Bourbon"
 1781 - 3 sous "Isles de France et de Bourbon"
 1816, billon 10 centimes were struck in the name of the Isle de Bourbon (as Réunion was then known). In 1896, cupro-nickel 50 centimes and 1 franc coins were issued.
 1920, aluminium 5, 10 and 25 centime bank tokens were issued, which circulated until 1941.
 1948, aluminium 1 and 2 francs coins were introduced
 1955  aluminium 5 francs and aluminium-bronze 10 and 20 francs.
 1962 and 1964 Nickel 50 and 100 francs.
All denominations were issued until 1975.

Banknotes
The Banque de la Réunion introduced notes for 5, 10, 25, 100 and 500 francs between 1873 and 1876. Between 1884 and 1886, the Colonial Treasury (Trésor Colonial) issued notes for 50 centimes, 1, 2 and 3 francs.

In 1917, the Banque de la Réunion issued emergency small change notes for 5 and 10 centimes. The Bank introduced 1000 francs notes in 1937 and 5000 francs in 1940. During the Second World War, the Bank issued 50 centimes, 1 and 2 francs notes, first under the auspices of Vichy France, then of the Free French. The Banque de la Réunion ceased note issuing in 1944.

In 1943, the Caisse Centrale de la France Libre (Central Cashier of Free France) issued 5, 100 and 1000 francs notes of the same type as issued in French Equatorial Africa for use in Réunion. In 1944, the Caisse Centrale de la France d'Outre Mer (Central Cashier of Overseas France) issued 100 and 1000 francs notes in the same way. In 1947, the Caisse Centrale de la France d'Outre-Mer issued French Equatorial African notes for 5, 10, 20, 50, 100, 500, 1000 and 5000 francs overprinted with "La Réunion".

In 1962, the Institut d'Émission des Départements d'Outre-Mer took over paper money issue, with notes for 100, 500, 1000 and 500 francs, overprinted with either "La Réunion" or "Département de la Réunion". In 1960, 500 1000 and 5000 francs notes were issued overprinted with the denomination in new francs (10, 20 and 100 nouveaux francs).

See also 
 CFA franc

References

External links
 www.mi-aime-a-ou.com/cfa_ile_reunion.htm -  Pictures of Réunion CFA Bills -  (not linkable)
 Pictures of Réunion CFA Coins

Modern obsolete currencies
Currencies of Africa
2002 disestablishments in Africa
1920 establishments in Africa